Searsia batophylla (syn. Rhus batophylla), the bramble currant, is a localized shrub that is endemic to the vicinities of Steelpoort and Burgersfort in Sekhukhuneland, Limpopo, South Africa. It is an evergreen, drought resistant plant that grows in the rain shadow of the Limpopo Drakensberg. Its natural range has been impacted by mining, human settlements and overgrazing. Though locally common in 26 sub-populations, it is estimated that they have been reduced to some 30% of their former population and range due to these human activities.

References

batophylla
Flora of South Africa
Endemic flora of South Africa
Drought-tolerant plants
Garden plants